Hazelmere Dam is a combined concrete gravity type dam located on the Mdloti River, Kwazulu Natal, South Africa. It was established in 1977 and its primary purpose is to serve for irrigation and domestic use. The hazard potential of the dam assembly has been ranked high (3).

See also
List of reservoirs and dams in South Africa
List of rivers of South Africa

References 

 List of South African Dams from the Department of Water Affairs and Forestry (South Africa)

External links
Hazelmere Dam recreation resort

Dams in South Africa
Dams completed in 1977